Akashamittayee is a 2017 Indian Malayalam-language family drama film co-directed by Samuthirakani and M. Padmakumar. Written by k. Gireesh Kumar. Scripted by Samuthirakani, it is a remake of his 2016 Tamil film Appa directed by Samuthirakani with Yuvasri Lakshmi and Nasath reprising their roles. The film stars Jayaram, Kalabhavan Shajohn, Iniya, and Sarayu in the lead roles. It was released in Kerala on 19 October 2017 coinciding with Deepavali. The movie nicely captures the area around Hindustan Newsprint Limited (HNL), located at Velloor in Kottayam District in Kerala.

Plot 

The story is about two fathers with different mindsets, and how that reflects on the way they raise their respective kids.

Cast 

Jayaram as Jayasankar
Kalabhavan Shajohn as Peethambaran
Iniya as Radhika
Sarayu as Rekha
Yuva Lakshmi as Aparna
Nandhana Varma as Saira Bhanu
Dev Prayag Hari as young Aakash 
Akash Sandhyamohan as teenage Aakash 
Anil Murali as Pazhani
Usha as Pazhani's wife
Nasath as Ajith Pazhani
Seema G. Nair as Aparna's mother
Anthony Kochi as Radhika's father
Suresh Krishna as Dr. Mohan
Sidhartha Siva as Headmaster
Majeed as School staff
Irshad as Joseph
Arjun Raveendran
Balachandran Chullukkadu as himself
Enosh Tenson as Raja Raja Cholan

Soundtrack 

The songs were composed by Manzoor Ahamed. The soundtrack album, which was released on 2017, features songs with lyrics penned by Rafeeq Ahmed.

References

External links 
 

2017 films
2010s Malayalam-language films
Films about the education system in India
Malayalam remakes of Tamil films
Indian drama films
Films directed by Samuthirakani
Films directed by M. Padmakumar
2017 drama films